Ricardo Taitano (born 1957) is a Guam long-distance runner. He competed in the men's marathon at the 1988 Summer Olympics.

References

External links
 

1957 births
Living people
Athletes (track and field) at the 1988 Summer Olympics
Guamanian male long-distance runners
Guamanian male marathon runners
Olympic track and field athletes of Guam
Place of birth missing (living people)